Saccodomus is a genus of spiders in the family Thomisidae. It was first described in 1900 by Rainbow. , it contains only one species, Saccodomus formivorus, found in New South Wales.

References

Thomisidae
Monotypic Araneomorphae genera
Spiders of Australia